Simone di Niccolò Bianco (1480s – after 1553), was an Italian Renaissance sculptor. 

Born in Loro Ciuffenna, Tuscany, he spent his artistic career in Venice from 1512 onwards. He was known for sculpture of busts in marble and bronze all'antica. Bianco was highly regarded by Johann Christoph Fugger and Pietro Aretino, and by Giorgio Vasari who gave him a brief mention in his Lives of the Artists.

References

Italian male sculptors
16th-century Italian sculptors
Year of birth unknown
Year of death unknown
Italian Renaissance sculptors